Manatee County Area Transit (MCAT) provides public transportation for Manatee County, Florida and is operated by the county. the system had about  riders per weekday as of .

Fares 
The regular bus fare is $1.50 on all local fixed routes. Discounted fares of $0.75 are available for students, disabled (with mobility card), seniors, medicare card holders, and active duty and military veterans. There is no fare for children 5 years or younger and seniors 80 and older. There is no fare for the Anna Maria Island Trolley and the Sunday Beach Express. Discounted fares are not available for the Longboat Key Shuttle.

Unlimited ride cards ("M Cards") are available for purchase for 1 day, 7 day, or 31 days. Regular and discounted rates are available. There is also a 31-day regional pass ("R Card") available for purchase. This pass is good for unlimited rides on both MCAT and SCAT (Sarasota County Area Transit) buses.

Riders can also purchase and access their bus passes using the Token Transit mobile ticketing app for both local and regional fares.

A Mobility Card will be provided to the rider by MCAT when a disability or Veteran status is present to serve as documentation and proof for the discount card. The Mobility Card will alleviate the need to carry medical or Veteran documentation that qualifies the rider for the discount card. This is a separate card from the M Card and will need to be carried with the M Card in case verification is needed. Mobility Cards can be obtained by presenting a letter from a physician or Veteran eligibility paperwork to the Downtown Station and Desoto Station Ticket Sales Offices.

Bus routes 
Most local fixed route bus services operate Monday through Saturday from 5:30 a.m. to 8 p.m.

Skyway ConneXion service operates on weekdays ONLY, no service on Sundays and holidays.

The Anna Maria Island Trolley operates daily from 6 a.m. to 10:30 p.m. The Beach Express operates Sundays and holidays from 9 a.m. – 5 p.m.

Fixed route and Handy Bus service ends at 3 p.m. on Christmas Eve. The Longboat Key Shuttle service will end at 7 p.m. on Christmas Eve.

The Anna Maria Island Trolley service operates all holidays. Service will end at 7 p.m. on Christmas Eve.

The Beach Express operates on all Sundays and Holidays.

Bus Fleet 

MCAT's fleet consists of Gillig Phantom, Low Floor, Low Floor BRT, and Replica Trolley. They operate both clean-diesel and diesel-electric hybrid buses.

In 2018, MCAT was awarded $1.9 million by the U.S. Department of Transportation Federal Transit Administration to replace or rehabilitate their fleet of buses.

References

External links 
Manatee County Area Transit

Transportation in Manatee County, Florida
Bradenton, Florida
Bus transportation in Florida